Nikola Ivanović (born February 19, 1994) is a Montenegrin professional basketball player for Crvena zvezda of the Adriatic League and the EuroLeague.

Professional career

Early career
Ivanović started his career in local club KK Joker Podgorica. He then played for Mornar Bar during the 2010–11 season, averaging 10.1 points, 4.5 assists and 3.8 steals per game. While in Mornar he also averaged 11.3 points, 3.1 assists and 1.5 steals per game during 2010–11 BIBL season.

Budućnost Podgorica
In 2011, Ivanović transferred to the biggest Montenegrin basketball club, Budućnost Podgorica, signing his first professional contract in February 2012, after he turned 18. In his first season with the team, he averaged 6.9 points, 1.4 assists and 1 steal per game in 16.2 minutes per game played in the 2011–12 ABA League season.

During the 2013–14 season, Ivanović was handed a chance with being the first point guard option for Budućnost due to the injury of the starting point guard, Aleksandar Ćapin. Ivanović took up the opportunity in the late half of the season and had his best showings against Union Olimpija when he scored 28 points, making 8 out of his 11 shots for two points and also adding one three-pointer. In the same game he also had 3 assists and 2 steals with an index rating of 31.

In the next game against Szolnoki Olaj he again showed great performance by scoring 27 points, making 4 assists and taking 2 steals. He shot 4 from 7 for two points and made 5 out of 7 three-pointers. He had a final index rating of 36.

On July 15, 2015, he parted ways with Budućnost.

Mega Leks
On July 31, 2015, Ivanović moved to Serbia and signed with Mega Leks. In Adriatic League he averaged 30.2 minutes with 13.4 points, 5.2 assists and 1.5 steals. He won the Serbian Cup with Mega Leks against rivals Partizan. In the finals he scored 24 points, five assists and he was the MVP of the competition.

AEK Athens / Orlandina
On June 14, 2016, Ivanović signed a three-year contract with the Greek club AEK Athens. On January 11, 2017, he was loaned to Italian club Orlandina Basket for the rest of the 2016–17 Serie A season.

Budućnost VOLI
On September 13, 2017, Ivanović returned to Budućnost VOLI.

Crvena zvezda mts
On June 18, 2021, he has signed with Crvena zvezda of the Adriatic League. The club won ABA League, Serbian League, and Serbian Cup in the 2021–22 season.

Montenegrin national team
After going through many youth national teams of Montenegro, Ivanović became standard member of the senior Montenegrin national team.
On 18 August 2012, Ivanović scored an amazing three-pointer buzzer beater from a half court in a match against Serbia.

Career statistics

Basketball Champions League

|-
| style="text-align:left;" | 2016–17
| style="text-align:left;" | A.E.K.
| 11 || 17.0 || .408 || .310 || 1.000 || 1.1 || 1.1 || .9 || 0 || 4.9
|}

References

External links
Nikola Ivanović at aba-liga.com
Nikola Ivanović at fiba.com
Nikola Ivanović at fiba.com (game-center)
Nikola Ivanović at eurobasket.com
Nikola Ivanović at euroleague.net

1994 births
Living people
2019 FIBA Basketball World Cup players
ABA League players
AEK B.C. players
Basketball League of Serbia players
Greek Basket League players
KK Budućnost players
KK Crvena zvezda players
KK Mega Basket players
KK Mornar Bar players
Lega Basket Serie A players
Montenegrin expatriate basketball people in Greece
Montenegrin expatriate basketball people in Italy
Montenegrin expatriate basketball people in Serbia
Montenegrin men's basketball players
Orlandina Basket players
Point guards
Sportspeople from Podgorica